Savidge Lake is a lake in Le Sueur County, in the U.S. state of Minnesota.

Savidge Lake was named for a local settler.

References

Lakes of Minnesota
Lakes of Le Sueur County, Minnesota